The Pichachén Pass (Spanish: Paso Pichachén) is a pass over the Andes mountains that connects Argentina and Chile. The border crossing between Argentina and Chile is at 2,060 m (6,760 ft) AMSL.

See also 

 Biobio Region, Chile
 Neuquén Province, Argentina

Gallery

References 

Argentina–Chile border crossings
Mountain passes of Chile
Mountain passes of Argentina
Mountain passes of the Andes
Landforms of Biobío Region
Landforms of Neuquén Province